Alicia Elena Pérez Duarte (born 15 May 1953) is a Mexican lawyer and researcher who focuses on human rights and women's legal status. She is a member of the Sistema Nacional de Investigadores (National System of Researchers) and a co-founder of the Programa Universitario de Estudios de Género (PUEG, University Program for Gender Studies) at the National Autonomous University of Mexico. In addition to her work in private legal practice, she has served as a magistrate for the Superior Tribunal of Mexico City, as technical secretary for the Commission investigating femicides in Ciudad Juárez, and as a special prosecutor for crimes against women.

Early life and education
Alicia Elena Pérez Duarte was born 15 May 1953 in Ocotlán, Jalisco, México. From a young age, she defied conventions which required her to wear dresses and though she took ballet, she quit as a teenager to work in secret so she could have her own money. Her family were well-off and lived abroad for part of her childhood, but her parents divorced when she was thirteen. Pérez-Duarte completed middle and high school in a convent school in Jalisco. After she graduated in 1972, she enrolled at the National Autonomous University of Mexicoto study law. She completed both her licentiate (1977) and master's degree (1981) with distinction, earning the Medalla Gabino Barreda for her academic merit.

Career
Pérez-Duarte opened her own legal firm in 1977 and mainly dealt with clients in civil cases and family law. In 1983, she was also hired to work in the Instituto de Investigaciones Jurídica (Legal Research Institute) of UNAM. In addition to her private practice, Pérez-Duarte taught general law at the preparatory school "Colegio Montaignac", legal theory and practices at the Universidad Intercontinental, and civil law at UNAM. In 1988, she was contacted by a friend to become the legal representative of Chavela Vargas, an iconic singer who was an alcoholic and was in danger of being swindled by her record label. Pérez became Vargas' legal representative from that time until her death and the two had a romantic relationship that lasted for almost a decade. The two women lived together for four of those years with Pérez-Duarte's two children.

In 1992, along with other feminist scholars, Pérez-Duarte founded the Programa Universitario de Estudios de Género (PUEG, University Program for Gender Studies) at the National Autonomous University of Mexico. That year, she was also appointed to serve as the legal director of public services for civil and family matters in the Attorney General's office. In 1993, she was appointed as the Numerary Magistrate of the Supreme Tribunal of Justice of the Federal District. During her tenure, she was active in the fight against femicide and violence against women. Her activism led to appointments as Mexico's delegate to the Pan American Health Organization, the United Nations Development Programme, the World Organisation Against Torture, as well as other international and multi-national organizations striving for equality and the right to live violence-free.

Peréz-Duarte was appointed to serve as the technical secretary of the Senate Monitoring Commission for femicides in Ciudad Juárez between 2003 and 2005. In 2006 became the special prosecutor for crimes and acts of violence toward women. Among the cases investigated were the allegations of kidnapping and torture of Lydia Cacho in Cancun; a child pornography ring that was operating in Cancun, Chihuahua, Mexicali, and Tijuana; and the rape by police on a group of women in San Salvador Atenco. After serving twenty-two months, she resigned from the post because of bureaucratic delays and politically motivated exonerations or dismissals. Resigning from public service, Peréz returned to UNAM in 2008 and was appointed as the Leandro Azuara Pérez Chair in the law faculty.

Research
Pérez-Duarte is a member of the Sistema Nacional de Investigadores (National System of Researchers). She has written numerous articles and books on the legal implications of gender on human rights. Many of her works, such as a series entitled Análisis comparativo de legislación local e internacional relativa a la mujer y a la niñez (Comparative Analysis of Local and International Legislation Related to Women and Children) written in conjunction with other authors for each Mexican state, were prepared for the National Commission of Human Rights and other public service organizations. Besides her written work, Pérez-Duarte has presented more than three hundred conferences and seminars and participated in numerous round-talbe discussions nationally and internationally on human rights.

 Other locations such as Aguascaliente , Chiapas , Guanajuato , Michoacán , Veracruz  etc.

References

Citations

Bibliography

1953 births
Living people
People from Jalisco
National Autonomous University of Mexico alumni
Academic staff of the National Autonomous University of Mexico
LGBT academics
LGBT lawyers
Gender studies academics
21st-century Mexican lawyers
Mexican women's rights activists
20th-century Mexican lawyers
Mexican women lawyers
20th-century women lawyers
21st-century women lawyers
Mexican women activists
Mexican women academics
Sexually fluid women
20th-century Mexican LGBT people
21st-century Mexican LGBT people